Concertato  is a term in early Baroque music referring to either a genre or a style of music in which groups of instruments or voices share a melody, usually in alternation, and almost always over a basso continuo.  The term derives from Italian concerto which means "playing together"—hence concertato means "in the style of a concerto."  In contemporary usage, the term is almost always used as an adjective, for example "three pieces from the set are in concertato style."

A somewhat oversimplified, but useful distinction between concertato and concerto can be made:  the concertato style involves contrast between opposing groups of voices and groups of instruments:  the concerto style, especially as it developed into the concerto grosso later in the Baroque, involves contrast between large and small groups of similar composition (later called "ripieno" and "concertino").

The style developed in Venice in the late 16th century, mainly through the work of Andrea and Giovanni Gabrieli, who were working in the unique acoustical space of St. Mark's Basilica.  Different choirs or instrumental groupings occupied positions across the basilica from each other:  because of the sound delay from one side to the other in the large and acoustically "live" space, a perfect unison was difficult, and composers found that a fantastically effective music could be composed with the choirs singing across to each other, in stereo as it were; all accompanied by organ or other groups of instruments placed in such a way that they could hear each group equally well.  Music written there was quickly performed elsewhere, and compositions in the new "concertato" style quickly became popular elsewhere in Europe (first in northern Italy, then in Germany and the rest of Italy, and then gradually in other parts of the continent).  Another term sometimes used for this antiphonal use of the choirs in St. Mark's was cori spezzati. See also Venetian polychoral style and Venetian School.

In the early 17th century, almost all music with voices and basso continuo was called a concerto, though this use of the term is considerably different from the more modern meaning (a solo instrument or instruments accompanied by an orchestra).  Often, sacred music in the concertato style in the early 17th century was descended from the motet:  the texts that a hundred years earlier would have been set for a cappella voices singing in smooth polyphony, would now be set for voices and instruments in a concertato style.  These pieces, no longer always called motets, were given a variety of names including concerto, Psalm (if a psalm setting), sinfonia, or symphoniae (for example in Heinrich Schütz's three books of Symphoniae sacrae).

The concertato style made possible the composition of extremely dramatic music, one of the characteristic innovations of the early Baroque.

Composers of music in concertato style

 Giovanni Croce
 Ignazio Donati
 Andrea Gabrieli
 Giovanni Gabrieli
 Alessandro Grandi
 Johann Kaspar Kerll
 Claudio Monteverdi
 Michael Praetorius
 Samuel Scheidt
 Johann Hermann Schein
 Heinrich Schütz
 Lodovico Viadana

Sources

 Manfred Bukofzer, Music in the Baroque Era.  New York, W.W. Norton & Co., 1947. 
 The New Harvard Dictionary of Music, ed. Don Randel.  Cambridge, Massachusetts, Harvard University Press, 1986. 
 Article "concertato" in The New Grove Dictionary of Music and Musicians, ed. Stanley Sadie.  20 vol.  London, Macmillan Publishers Ltd., 1980. 

Musical techniques
Renaissance music
Baroque music